Mary Jane may refer to:

People 
 Mary Jane Goodson Carlisle (1835-1905), acting First Lady of the United States during the term of Chester Arthur and the first year of Grover Cleveland
 Mary Jane Clark (born 1954), American author
 Mary Jane Croft (1916–1999), American actress
 Mary Jane Irving (1913–1983), American actress
 Mary Jane Kelly (1863–1888), Jack the Ripper victim
 Mary Jane Lamond (born 1960), Canadian Celtic folk musician
 Mary Jane Osborn (born 1927), American biochemist
 Mary Jane Owen (1929-2019), disability rights activist, philosopher, policy expert and writer
 Mary Jane Peale (1827–1902), American painter
 Mary Jane Phillips-Matz (1926–2013), American biographer
 Mary Jane Rathbun (1922–1999), American medical cannabis activist, popularly known as Brownie Mary
 Mary Jane Reoch (1945–1993), American cyclist
 Mary Jane Russell (1926-2003), American photographic fashion model
 Mary Jane Truman (1889–1978), younger sister of Harry S. Truman
 Mary Jane Veloso, a Filipina woman who was convicted in Indonesia for drug trafficking

Arts, entertainment, and media

Fictional characters
 Mary Jane and Sniffles, characters in Looney Tunes and Merrie Melodies Comics
 Mary Jane Watson, a love interest of Marvel Comics' Spider-Man

Music
 "Mary Jane (All Night Long)", a 1995 song by Mary J. Blige
 "Mary Jane" (Janis Joplin song), a song performed by Janis Joplin
 "Mary Jane" (Megadeth song), a 1988 song on Megadeth's album So Far, So Good... So What!
 "Mary Jane" (Rick James song), a 1978 song on Rick James' album Come Get It!
 "Mary Jane" (Scarface song), the second single released from Scarface's fourth album, The Untouchable
 "Mary Jane", a song by The Miracle Workers
 "Mary Jane", a song on Luke Tan's album The Suicide King
 "Mary Jane", a song on Alanis Morissette's album Jagged Little Pill
 "Mary Jane", a song on DE/VISION album Devolution
 "Mary Jane", a song on IllScarlett's EPdemic and Clearly in Another Fine Mess
 "Mary Jane", a song on The Click Five's album Modern Minds and Pastimes
 "Mary Jane", a song on the Happy Birthday solo album by Pete Townshend of The Who
 "Mary Jane", a song on The Spin Doctors' album Turn It Upside Down
 "Mary Jane", a song on the Technohead album Headsex
 "Mary Jane", a song on The Vines' album Highly Evolved
 "Mary Jane", a song on Davido's album Omo Baba Olowo 
 "Mary Jane", a 2009 song by Tori Amos from her album Abnormally Attracted to Sin
 "Mary Jane", a 2018 song by Radio and Weasel of Goodlyfe Crew 
 The Mary Janes, a 1990s Irish band formed by Mic Christopher, et al

Other uses in arts, entertainment, and media
 "Mary Jane", a poem by Patti Smith from her 1972 book Seventh Heaven
 Mary + Jane, an MTV television series
 Maryjane (film), 1968 film starring Fabian

Other uses
 Mary Jane (candy), a brand name of confectionery formerly manufactured by NECCO
 Mary Jane (shoe), a type of shoe
 Mary Jane (slang), a slang term for marijuana
 Mary Jane Ski Resort, part of the Winter Park Resort in Grand County, Colorado

See also